Geotechnical engineering, also known as geotechinics, is the branch of civil engineering concerned with the engineering behavior of earth materials. It uses the principles of soil mechanics and rock mechanics for the solution of its respective engineering problems. It also relies on knowledge of geology, hydrology, geophysics, and other related sciences. Geotechnical (rock) engineering is a subdiscipline of geological engineering.

In addition to civil engineering, geotechnical engineering also has applications in military, mining, petroleum, coastal engineering, and offshore construction. The fields of geotechnical engineering and engineering geology have knowledge areas that overlap. However, while geotechnical engineering is a specialty of civil engineering, engineering geology is a specialty of geology. They share the same principles of soil mechanics and rock mechanics, but differ in the application.

History
Humans have historically used soil as a material for flood control, irrigation purposes, burial sites, building foundations, and  construction materials for buildings. Early activities were linked to irrigation and flood control, as demonstrated by traces of dykes, dams, and canals dating back to at least 2000 BCE that were found in ancient Egypt, ancient Mesopotamia, and the Fertile Crescent, as well as around the early settlements of Mohenjo Daro and Harappa in the Indus valley. As cities expanded, structures were erected and supported by formalized foundations. The ancient Greeks notably constructed pad footings and strip-and-raft foundations. Until the 18th century, however, no theoretical basis for soil design had been developed, and the discipline was more of an art than a science, relying on experience.

Several foundation-related engineering problems, such as the Leaning Tower of Pisa, prompted scientists to begin taking a more scientific-based approach to examining the subsurface. The earliest advances occurred in the development of earth pressure theories for the construction of retaining walls. Henri Gautier, a French Royal Engineer, recognized the "natural slope" of different soils in 1717, an idea later known as the soil's angle of repose. A rudimentary soil classification system was also developed based on a material's unit weight, which is no longer considered a good indication of soil type.

The application of the principles of mechanics to soils was documented as early as 1773 when Charles Coulomb (a physicist, engineer, and army captain) developed improved methods to determine the earth pressures against military ramparts. By combining Coulomb's theory with Christian Otto Mohr's 2D stress state, the theory became known as Mohr-Coulomb theory. Although it is now recognized that precise determination of cohesion is impossible because  is not a fundamental soil property, the Mohr-Coulomb theory is still used in practice today.

In the 19th century, Henry Darcy developed what is now known as Darcy's Law, describing the flow of fluids in a porous media. Joseph Boussinesq (a mathematician and physicist) developed theories of stress distribution in elastic solids that proved useful for estimating stresses at depth in the ground. William Rankine, an engineer and physicist, developed an alternative to Coulomb's earth pressure theory. Albert Atterberg developed the clay consistency indices that are still used today for soil classification. In 1885, Osborne Reynolds recognized that shearing causes volumetric dilation of dense materials and contraction of loose granular materials.

Modern geotechnical engineering is said to have begun in 1925 with the publication of Erdbaumechanik by Karl Terzaghi (a mechanical engineer and geologist). Considered by many to be the father of modern soil mechanics and geotechnical engineering, Von Terzaghi developed the principle of effective stress, and demonstrated that the shear strength of soil is controlled by effective stress. Terzaghi also developed the framework for theories of bearing capacity of foundations, and the theory for prediction of the rate of settlement of clay layers due to consolidation. Afterwards, Maurice Biot fully developed the three-dimensional soil consolidation theory, extending the one-dimensional model previously developed by Terzaghi to more general hypotheses and introducing the set of basic equations of Poroelasticity. In 1960, Alec Skempton carried out an extensive review of the available formulations and experimental data in the literature about the effective stress validity in soil, concrete, and rock in order to reject some of these expressions, as well as clarify what expression was appropriate according to several working hypotheses, such as stress-strain or strength behavior, saturated or non-saturated media, and rock/concrete or soil behavior.
In his 1948 book, Donald Taylor recognized that the interlocking and dilation of densely packed particles contributed to the peak strength of the soil. The interrelationships between the volume change behavior (dilation, contraction, and consolidation) and shearing behavior were all connected via the theory of plasticity using critical state soil mechanics by Roscoe, Schofield, and Wroth with the publication of "On the Yielding of Soils" in 1958. Critical state soil mechanics is the basis for many contemporary advanced constitutive models describing the behavior of soil.

Geotechnical centrifuge modeling is a method of testing physical scale models of geotechnical problems. The use of a centrifuge enhances the similarity of the scale model tests involving soil because the strength and stiffness of soil is very sensitive to the confining pressure. The centrifugal acceleration allows a researcher to obtain large (prototype-scale) stresses in small physical models.

Soil mechanics 

In geotechnical engineering, soils are considered a three-phase material composed of rock or mineral particles, water, and air. The voids of soil, the spaces in between mineral particles, contain water and air.

The engineering properties of soils are affected by four main factors: the predominant size of the mineral particles, the type of mineral particles, the grain size distribution, and the relative quantities of minerals, water, and air present in the soil matrix. Fine particles (fines) are defined as particles less than 0.075 mm in diameter.

Soil properties

Some of the important properties of soils that are used by geotechnical engineers to analyze site conditions and design earthworks, retaining structures, and foundations are:
 Specific weight or Unit Weight The cumulative weight of the solid particles, water and air of the unit volume of soil. Note that the air phase is often assumed to be weightless.
 Porosity The ratio of the volume of voids (containing air, water, or other fluids) in the soil to the total volume of the soil. Porosity is mathematically related to void ratio as shown below

here e is void ratio and n is porosity
 Void ratio The ratio of the volume of voids to the volume of solid particles in a soil mass. Void ratio is mathematically related to the porosity by

 Permeability A measure of the ability of water to flow through the soil. It is expressed in units of darcies (d). Permeability of 1 d allows the flow of 1 cm3 per second of fluid with 1 cP (centipoise) viscosity through a cross-sectional area of 1 cm2 when a pressure gradient of 1 atm/cm is applied.
 Compressibility The rate of change of volume with effective stress. If the pores are filled with water, then the water must be squeezed out of the pores to allow volumetric compression of the soil; this process is called consolidation.
 Shear strength The maximum shear stress that can be applied in a soil mass without causing shear failure.
 Atterberg Limits Liquid limit, Plastic limit, and Shrinkage limit. These indices are used for estimation of other engineering properties and for soil classification.

Geotechnical investigation 

The tasks of a geotechnical engineer comprise the investigation of subsurface conditions and materials; the determination of the relevant physical, mechanical, and chemical properties of these materials; the design of earthworks and retaining structures (including dams, embankments, sanitary landfills, deposits of hazardous waste), tunnels, and structure foundations; the monitoring of site conditions, earthwork, and foundation construction; the evaluation of the stability of natural slopes and man-made soil deposits; the assessment of the risks posed by site conditions; and the prediction, prevention, and mitigation of damage caused by natural hazards (such as avalanches, mud flows, landslides, rockslides, sinkholes, and volcanic eruptions).

Geotechnical engineers and engineering geologists perform geotechnical investigations to obtain information on the physical properties of soil and rock underlying (and sometimes adjacent to) a site to design earthworks and foundations for proposed structures, and for the repair of distress to earthworks and structures caused by subsurface conditions. A geotechnical investigation will include surface exploration and subsurface exploration of a site. Sometimes, geophysical methods are used to obtain data about sites. Subsurface exploration usually involves in-situ testing (two common examples of in-situ tests are the standard penetration test and cone penetration test). In addition site investigation will often include subsurface sampling and laboratory testing of the soil samples retrieved. The digging of test pits and trenching (particularly for locating faults and slide planes) may also be used to learn about soil conditions at depth. Large diameter borings are rarely used due to safety concerns and expense, but are sometimes used to allow a geologist or engineer to be lowered into the borehole for direct visual and manual examination of the soil and rock stratigraphy.

A variety of soil samplers exists to meet the needs of different engineering projects. The standard penetration test (SPT), which uses a thick-walled split spoon sampler, is the most common way to collect disturbed samples. Piston samplers, employing a thin-walled tube, are most commonly used for the collection of less disturbed samples. More advanced methods, such as the Sherbrooke block sampler, are superior, but even more expensive. Coring frozen ground provides high-quality undisturbed samples from any ground conditions, such as fill, sand, moraine and rock fracture zones.

Atterberg limits tests, water content measurements, and grain size analysis, for example, may be performed on disturbed samples obtained from thick-walled soil samplers. Properties such as shear strength, stiffness, hydraulic conductivity, and coefficient of consolidation may be significantly altered by sample disturbance. To measure these properties in the laboratory, high-quality sampling is required.  Common tests to measure strength and stiffness include the triaxial shear and unconfined compression test. These can all be done through a third party testing company such as Intertek.

Surface exploration can include geologic mapping, geophysical methods, and photogrammetry; or it can be as simple as an engineer walking around to observe the physical conditions at the site.  Geologic mapping and interpretation of geomorphology are typically completed in consultation with a geologist or engineering geologist.

Geophysical exploration is also sometimes used.  Geophysical techniques used for subsurface exploration include measurement of seismic waves (pressure, shear, and Rayleigh waves), surface-wave methods and/or downhole methods, and electromagnetic surveys (magnetometer, resistivity, and ground-penetrating radar).

Infrastructure 
 Medium / Heavy-duty percussion drilling winches.
 Heavy-duty rotary diamond core drill machine.
 Light duty geo machine.
 Manual winches with tripod.
 Dynamic cone penetration test machine.
 Static cone penetration machine.
 Pressure meter test machine.
 Field vane shear test machine.
 Field CBR (California Bearing Ratio) test machine.
 Block vibration test machine.
 Rapid moisture meter machine.
 In Situ density core cutter machine.
 Standard Penetration Test machine.
 Field permeability single and double packer machine.

Application 
 DESIGN OF BRIDGES: Foundation type and Depth Recommendation.
 DESIGN OF TUNNEL: RMR and Q value calculation.
 STRUCTURAL DESIGN OF BUILDINGS: Brings out the safe bearing load.
 DESIGN OF RETAINING STRUCTURES: Recommendation of Ground improvement technique.

Structures

Foundations 

The foundation of a building's or transportation infrastructure transmits loads from the structures to the earth. Geotechnical engineers design foundations based on the load characteristics of the structure and the properties of the soils and/or bedrock at the site. In general, geotechnical engineers:
 Estimate the magnitude and location of the loads to be supported.
 Develop an investigation plan to explore the subsurface.
 Determine the necessary soil parameters through field and lab testing (e.g., consolidation test, triaxial shear test, vane shear test, standard penetration test).
 Design the foundation in the safest and most economical manner.

The primary considerations for foundation support are bearing capacity, settlement, and ground movement beneath the foundations. Bearing capacity is the ability of the site soils to support the loads imposed by buildings or structures. Settlement occurs under all foundations in all soil conditions, though lightly loaded structures or rock sites may experience negligible settlements. For heavier structures and/or softer soils, both overall settlement relative to unbuilt areas or neighboring buildings, and differential settlement under a single structure can be of concerns. Of particular concern is a settlement which occurs over time, as immediate settlement can usually be compensated for during construction. Ground movement beneath a structure's foundations can occur due to low bearing capacity soils (soft clay, silt, organic, loose sand), volumetric change of expansive soils due to moisture or freeze-thaw cycles or melting of permafrost, or due to unsuitable fill material with low strength, highly compressible and high water content. All these factors must be considered during the design of foundations.

In areas of shallow bedrock, most foundations may bear directly on bedrock; in other areas, the soil may provide sufficient strength for the support of structures. In areas of deeper bedrock with soft overlying soils, deep foundations are used to support structures directly on the bedrock; in areas where bedrock is not economically available, stiff "bearing layers" are used to support deep foundations instead.

Shallow

Shallow foundations are a type of foundation that transfers the building load to very near the surface, rather than to a subsurface layer. Shallow foundations typically have a depth to width ratio of less than 1.

Footings
Footings (often called "spread footings" because they spread the load) are structural elements which transfer structure loads to the ground by direct areal contact. Footings can be isolated footings for point or column loads or strip footings for wall or another long (line) loads. Footings are normally constructed from reinforced concrete cast directly onto the soil and are typically embedded into the ground to penetrate through the zone of frost movement and/or to obtain additional bearing capacity.

Slab
A variant on spread footings is to have the entire structure bear on a single slab of concrete underlying the entire area of the structure. Slabs must be thick enough to provide sufficient rigidity to spread the bearing loads somewhat uniformly and to minimize differential settlement across the foundation. In some cases, flexure is allowed and the building is constructed to tolerate small movements of the foundation instead. For small structures, like single-family houses, the slab may be less than 300  mm thick; for larger structures, the foundation slab may be several meters thick.

Slab foundations can be either slab-on-grade foundations or embedded foundations, typically in buildings with basements. Slab-on-grade foundations must be designed to allow for potential ground movement due to changing soil conditions.

Deep

Deep foundations are used for structures or heavy loads when shallow foundations cannot provide adequate capacity, due to size and structural limitations. They may also be used to transfer building loads past weak or compressible soil layers. While shallow foundations rely solely on the bearing capacity of the soil beneath them, deep foundations can rely on end bearing resistance, frictional resistance along their length, or both in developing the required capacity. Geotechnical engineers use specialized tools, such as the cone penetration test, to estimate the amount of skin and end bearing resistance available in the subsurface.

There are many types of deep foundations including piles, drilled shafts, caissons, piers, and earth stabilized columns. Large buildings such as skyscrapers typically require deep foundations. For example, the Jin Mao Tower in China uses tubular steel piles about 1m (3.3  feet) driven to a depth of 83.5m (274  feet) to support its weight.

In buildings that are constructed and found to undergo settlement, underpinning piles can be used to stabilize the existing building.

There are three ways to place piles for a deep foundation.  They can be driven, drilled, or installed by the use of an auger.  Driven piles are extended to their necessary depths with the application of external energy in the same way a nail is hammered.  There are four typical hammers used to drive such piles:  drop hammers, diesel hammers, hydraulic hammers, and air hammers.  Drop hammers simply drop a heavy weight onto the pile to drive it, while diesel hammers use a single-cylinder diesel engine to force piles through the Earth.  Similarly, hydraulic and air hammers supply energy to piles through hydraulic and air forces.  The energy imparted from a hammerhead varies with the type of hammer chosen and can be as high as a million-foot pounds for large scale diesel hammers, a very common hammerhead used in practice.  Piles are made of a variety of material including steel, timber, and concrete. Drilled piles are created by first drilling a hole to the appropriate depth, and filling it with concrete.  Drilled piles can typically carry more load than driven piles, simply due to a larger diameter pile.  The auger method of pile installation is similar to drilled pile installation, but concrete is pumped into the hole as the auger is being removed.

Lateral earth support structures 

A retaining wall is a structure that holds back earth. Retaining walls stabilize soil and rock from downslope movement or erosion and provide support for vertical or near-vertical grade changes. Cofferdams and bulkheads, structures to hold back water, are sometimes also considered retaining walls.

The primary geotechnical concern in design and installation of retaining walls is that the weight of the retained material is  creating lateral earth pressure behind the wall, which can cause the wall to deform or fail. The lateral earth pressure depends on the height of the wall, the density of the soil, the strength of the soil, and the amount of allowable movement of the wall. This pressure is smallest at the top and increases toward the bottom in a manner similar to hydraulic pressure, and tends to push the wall away from the backfill.  Groundwater behind the wall that is not dissipated by a drainage system causes an additional horizontal hydraulic pressure on the wall.

Gravity walls
Gravity walls depend on the size and weight of the wall mass to resist pressures from behind. Gravity walls will often have a slight setback, or batter, to improve wall stability. For short, landscaped walls, gravity walls made from geocells, dry-stacked (mortarless) stone or segmental concrete units (masonry units) are commonly used.

Earlier in the 20th century, taller retaining walls were often gravity walls made from large masses of concrete or stone. Today, taller retaining walls are increasingly built as composite gravity walls such as geocell retaining walls, steel-reinforced backfill soil with precast facing; gabions (stacked steel wire baskets filled with rocks), crib walls (cells built up log cabin style from precast concrete or timber and filled with soil or free-draining gravel) or soil-nailed walls (soil reinforced in place with steel and concrete rods).

For reinforced-soil gravity walls, the soil reinforcement is placed in horizontal layers throughout the height of the wall. Commonly, the soil reinforcement is geogrid, a high-strength polymer mesh, that provides tensile strength to hold the soil together. The wall face is often of a geocell or precast, segmental concrete units that can tolerate some differential movement. The reinforced soil's mass, along with the facing, becomes the gravity wall. The reinforced mass must be built large enough to retain the pressures from the soil behind it. Gravity walls usually must be a minimum of 30 to 40 percent as deep (thick) as the height of the wall and may have to be larger if there is a slope or surcharge on the wall.

Cantilever walls
Prior to the introduction of modern reinforced-soil gravity walls, cantilevered walls were the most common type of taller retaining wall. Cantilevered walls are made from a relatively thin stem of steel-reinforced, cast-in-place concrete or mortared masonry (often in the shape of an inverted T). These walls cantilever loads (like a beam) to a large structural footing; converting horizontal pressures from behind the wall to vertical pressures on the ground below. Sometimes cantilevered walls are buttressed on the front, or include a counterfort on the back, to improve their stability against high loads. Buttresses are short wing walls at right angles to the main trend of the wall. These walls require rigid concrete footings below seasonal frost depth. This type of wall uses much less material than a traditional gravity wall.

Cantilever walls resist lateral pressures by friction at the base of the wall and/or passive earth pressure, the tendency of the soil to resist lateral movement.

Basements are a form of cantilever walls, but the forces on the basement walls are greater than on conventional walls because the basement wall is not free to move.

Excavation shoring

Shoring of temporary excavations frequently requires a wall design that does not extend laterally beyond the wall, so shoring extends below the planned base of the excavation. Common methods of shoring are the use of sheet piles or soldier beams and lagging. Sheet piles are a form of driven piling using thin interlocking sheets of steel to obtain a continuous barrier in the ground and are driven prior to excavation. Soldier beams are constructed of wide flange steel H-sections spaced about 2–3 m apart, driven prior to excavation. As the excavation proceeds, horizontal timber or steel sheeting (lagging) is inserted behind the H-pile flanges.

The use of underground space requires excavation, which may cause large and dangerous displacement of soil mass around the excavation. Since the space for slope excavation is limited in urban areas, cutting is done vertically. Retaining walls are made to prevent unsafe soil displacements around excavations. Diaphragm walls are a type of retaining walls that are very stiff and generally watertight. The horizontal movements of diaphragm walls are usually prevented by lateral supports. Diaphragm walls are expensive walls, but they save time and space and are also safe, so are widely used in urban deep excavations.

In some cases, the lateral support which can be provided by the shoring wall alone is insufficient to resist the planned lateral loads; in this case, additional support is provided by walers or tie-backs. Walers are structural elements that connect across the excavation so that the loads from the soil on either side of the excavation are used to resist each other, or which transfer horizontal loads from the shoring wall to the base of the excavation. Tie-backs are steel tendons drilled into the face of the wall which extends beyond the soil which is applying pressure to the wall, to provide additional lateral resistance to the wall.

Earthworks 

Excavation is the process of training earth according to requirement by removing soil from the site, either to level the land or to replace inferior subgrade with a soil with higher bearing capacity.
Filling is the process of training earth according to requirement by placing the soil on the site and levelling or to add natural or processed geomaterials (e.g., crushed stone aggregate) to increase the soil strength and structure support layers.
Compaction is the process by which the density of soil is increased and permeability of soil is decreased. Fill placement work often has specifications requiring a specific degree of compaction, or alternatively, specific properties of the compacted soil. In-situ soils can be compacted by rolling, deep dynamic compaction, vibration, blasting, gyrating, kneading, compaction grouting etc.

Ground improvement
Ground improvement or modification is defined as the alteration of site foundation soils or project earth structures to provide better performance under design and/or operational loading conditions.  Usually, the properties modified are shear strength, stiffness, and permeability. Ground improvement has developed sophisticated methods to support foundations for a wide variety of buildings and transportation infrastructure, as urbanization and infrastructure spread to areas with challenging geotechnical conditions. Soil reinforcement is one of the most popular ground improvement techniques used to improve soil stiffness and strength. This can be achieved through different materials and techniques, e.g, reinforcement geosynthetics such as geocells and geogrids, which disperse loads over a larger area, thus increasing the load-bearing capacity of the soil. Properly applied, i.e. after giving due consideration to the nature of the ground being improved and the type and loading of the structures being built, hydraulic, mechanical, chemical and/or biological ground improvement methods reduce direct and long-term costs.

Slope stabilization

Slope stability is the potential of soil covered slopes to withstand and undergo movement. Stability is determined by the balance of shear stress and shear strength. A previously stable slope may be initially affected by preparatory factors, making the slope conditionally unstable. Triggering factors of a slope failure can be climatic events that can then make a slope actively unstable, leading to mass movements. Mass movements can be caused by increases in shear stress, such as loading, lateral pressure, and transient forces. Alternatively, shear strength may be decreased by weathering, changes in pore water pressure, and organic material.

Several modes of failure for earth slopes include falls, topples, slides, and flows.  In slopes with coarse-grained soil or rocks, falls typically occur as the rapid descent of rocks and other loose slope material.  A slope topples when a large column of soil tilts over its vertical axis at failure.  Typical slope stability analysis considers sliding failures, categorized mainly as rotational slides or translational slides.  As implied by the name, rotational slides fail along a generally curved surface, while translational slides fail along a more planar surface.  A slope failing as flow would resemble a fluid flowing downhill.

Slope stability analysis

Stability analysis is needed for the design of engineered slopes and for estimating the risk of slope failure in natural or designed slopes. A common assumption is that a slope consists of a layer of soil sitting on top of a rigid base. The mass and the base are assumed to interact via friction. The interface between the mass and the base can be planar, curved, or have some other complex geometry. The goal of a slope stability analysis is to determine the conditions under which the mass will slip relative to the base and lead to slope failure.

If the interface between the mass and the base of a slope has a complex geometry, slope stability analysis is difficult and numerical solution methods are required.  Typically, the exact geometry of the interface is not known and a simplified interface geometry is assumed.  Finite slopes require three-dimensional models to be analyzed.  To keep the problem simple, most slopes are analyzed assuming that the slopes are infinitely wide, and can therefore be represented by two-dimensional models.  A slope can be drained or undrained. The undrained condition is used in the calculations to produce conservative estimates of risk.

A popular stability analysis approach is based on principles pertaining to the limit equilibrium concept.  This method analyzes a finite or infinite slope as if it were about to fail along its sliding failure surface. Equilibrium stresses are calculated along the failure plane and compared to the soils shear strength as determined by Terzaghi's shear strength equation.  Stability is ultimately decided by a factor of safety equal to the ratio of shear strength to the equilibrium stresses along the failure surface.  A factor of safety greater than one generally implies a stable slope, failure of which should not occur assuming the slope is undisturbed. A factor of safety of 1.5 for static conditions is commonly used in practice.

Geosynthetics

Geosynthetics are a type of plastic polymer products used in geotechnical engineering that improve engineering performance while reducing costs. This includes geotextiles, geogrids, geomembranes, geocells, and geocomposites. The synthetic nature of the products makes them suitable for use in the ground where high levels of durability are required; their main functions include drainage, filtration, reinforcement, separation, and containment. Geosynthetics are available in a wide range of forms and materials, each to suit a slightly different end-use, although they are frequently used together. Some reinforcement geosynthetics, such as geogrids and more recently, cellular confinement systems, have shown to improve bearing capacity, modulus factors and soil stiffness and strength. These products have a wide range of applications and are currently used in many civil and geotechnical engineering applications including roads, airfields, railroads, embankments, piled embankments, retaining structures, reservoirs, canals, dams, landfills, bank protection and coastal engineering.

Offshore 

Offshore (or marine) geotechnical engineering is concerned with foundation design for human-made structures in the sea, away from the coastline (in opposition to onshore or nearshore). Oil platforms, artificial islands and submarine pipelines are examples of such structures. There are a number of significant differences between onshore and offshore geotechnical engineering. Notably, ground improvement (on the seabed) and site investigation are more expensive, the offshore structures are exposed to a wider range of geohazards, and the environmental and financial consequences are higher in case of failure. Offshore structures are exposed to various environmental loads, notably wind, waves and currents. These phenomena may affect the integrity or the serviceability of the structure and its foundation during its operational lifespan – they need to be taken into account in offshore design.

In subsea geotechnical engineering, seabed materials are considered a two-phase material composed of 1) rock or mineral particles and  2) water.  Structures may be fixed in place in the seabed—as is the case for piers, jettys and fixed-bottom wind turbines—or maybe a floating structure that remains roughly fixed relative to its geotechnical anchor point. Undersea mooring of human-engineered floating structures include a large number of offshore oil and gas platforms and, since 2008, a few floating wind turbines.  Two common types of engineered design for anchoring floating structures include tension-leg and catenary loose mooring systems.  "Tension
leg mooring systems have vertical tethers under tension providing large restoring moments in pitch and roll. Catenary mooring systems provide station keeping for an offshore structure, yet provide little stiffness at low tensions."

Observational method

In geotechnical engineering, during the construction of earth structures (dams and tunnels for example), the observational method is a continuous, managed and integrated process of design, construction control, monitoring and review enabling appropriate, previously-defined modifications to be incorporated during (or after) construction. All these aspects must be demonstrably robust. The objective is to achieve greater overall economy, without compromising safety.

The observational method was proposed by Karl Terzaghi and discussed in a paper by Ralph B. Peck (1969). This was in an effort to reduce the costs during construction incurred by designing earth structures based on the most-unfavorable assumptions (in other words, geological conditions, soil engineering properties and so on). Instead, the design is based on the most-probable conditions rather than the most-unfavorable. Gaps in the available information are filled by observations: geotechnical-instrumentation measurements (for example, inclinometers and piezometers) and geotechnical site investigation (for example, borehole drilling and a CPT). These observations aid in assessing the behavior of the structure during construction, which can then be modified in accordance with the findings. The method may be described as "learn-as-you-go".

The observational method may be described as follows:
Exploration sufficient to establish the general nature, pattern and properties of the deposits (not necessarily in detail).
Assessment of the most probable conditions, and the most unfavorable conceivable deviations from these conditions. Geology plays a major role.
Creating the design, based on a working hypothesis of behavior anticipated under the most-probable conditions.
Selection of quantities to be observed as construction proceeds, and calculation of their anticipated values based on the working hypothesis.
Calculation of values of the same quantities under the most unfavorable conditions compatible with the available data concerning subsurface conditions.
Selection (in advance) of a course of action or design modification for every foreseeable significant deviation of the observational findings from those predicted based on the working hypothesis.
Measurement of quantities to be observed and evaluation of actual conditions.
Design modification in accordance with actual conditions

The observational method is suitable for construction which has already begun when an unexpected development occurs, or when a failure or accident threatens or has already occurred. The method is not suitable for projects whose design cannot be altered during construction.

The most serious blunder in applying the observational method is failing to select (in advance) an appropriate course of action for all foreseeable deviations (disclosed by observation) from those assumed in the design. The engineer must devise solutions to all problems which could arise under the least-favorable conditions. If he or she cannot solve these hypothetical problems (even if the probability of their occurrence is very low), he or she must revert to a design based on the least-favorable conditions.

See also 

 Civil engineering
 Deep Foundations Institute
 Earthquake engineering
 Earth structure
 Effective stress
 Engineering geology
 Geological Engineering
 Geoprofessions
 Hydrogeology
 International Society for Soil Mechanics and Geotechnical Engineering
 Karl von Terzaghi
 Land reclamation
 Landfill
 List of publications in geotechnical engineering
 Mechanically stabilized earth
 Offshore geotechnical engineering
 Rock mass classifications
 Sediment control
 Seismology
 Soil mechanics
 Soil physics
 Soil science

Notes

References
 Bates and Jackson, 1980, Glossary of Geology: American Geological Institute.
 Krynine and Judd, 1957, Principles of Engineering Geology and Geotechnics: McGraw-Hill, New York.

Holtz, R. and Kovacs, W. (1981), An Introduction to Geotechnical Engineering, Prentice-Hall, Inc. 
Bowles, J. (1988), Foundation Analysis and Design, McGraw-Hill Publishing Company. 
Cedergren, Harry R. (1977), Seepage, Drainage, and Flow Nets, Wiley. 
Kramer, Steven L.  (1996), Geotechnical Earthquake Engineering, Prentice-Hall, Inc. 
Freeze, R.A. & Cherry, J.A., (1979), Groundwater, Prentice-Hall. 
Lunne, T. & Long, M.,(2006), Review of long seabed samplers and criteria for new sampler design, Marine Geology, Vol 226, p. 145–165
Mitchell, James K. & Soga, K. (2005), Fundamentals of Soil Behavior 3rd ed., John Wiley & Sons, Inc. 
Rajapakse, Ruwan., (2005), "Pile Design and Construction", 2005. 

Fang, H.-Y. and Daniels, J. (2005) Introductory Geotechnical Engineering : an environmental perspective, Taylor & Francis. 
NAVFAC (Naval Facilities Engineering Command) (1986) Design Manual 7.01, Soil Mechanics, US Government Printing Office
NAVFAC (Naval Facilities Engineering Command) (1986) Design Manual 7.02, Foundations and Earth Structures, US Government Printing Office
NAVFAC (Naval Facilities Engineering Command) (1983) Design Manual 7.03, Soil Dynamics, Deep Stabilization and Special Geotechnical Construction, US Government Printing Office
Terzaghi, K., Peck, R.B. and Mesri, G. (1996), Soil Mechanics in Engineering Practice 3rd Ed., John Wiley & Sons, Inc. 
Santamarina, J.C., Klein, K.A., & Fam, M.A. (2001), "Soils and Waves: Particulate Materials Behavior, Characterization and Process Monitoring", Wiley, 
Firuziaan, M. and Estorff, O., (2002), "Simulation of the Dynamic Behavior of Bedding-Foundation-Soil in the Time Domain", Springer Verlag.

External links
Worldwide Geotechnical Literature Database